Montecristo de Guerrero is a town and one of the 119 Municipalities of Chiapas, in southern Mexico.

As of 2010, the municipality had a total population of 6,900, up from 5,086 as of 2005. It covers an area of 190.3 km².

As of 2010, the town of Montecristo de Guerrero had a population of 2,546. Other than the town of Montecristo de Guerrero, the municipality had 85 localities, the largest of which (with 2010 populations in parentheses) were: Chalam (1,345), Tzoeptic (1,295), Chimhucum (1,143), and Oxinam (1,033), classified as urban, and classified as rural., and Laguna del Cofre (1,055), classified as rural.

References

Municipalities of Chiapas